Deutsche Arbeiter-Marseillaise (English: German Worker Marseillaise) is a song written in 1864 by Jacob Audorf for the General German Workers' Association to the melody of the Marseillaise.

Lyrics 
 Wohlan, wer Recht und Wahrheit achtet,
 zu unsrer Fahne steh allzuhauf!
 Wenn auch die Lüg uns noch umnachtet,
 bald steigt der Morgen hell herauf!
 Ein schwerer Kampf ist’s den wir wagen,
 zahllos ist unsrer Feinde Schar.
 Doch ob wie Flammen die Gefahr
 mög über uns zusammenschlagen,

 Refrain

 nicht fürchten wir den Feind,
 stehn wir im Kampf vereint!
 Marsch, marsch, marsch, marsch
 und sei’s durch Qual und Not,
 für Freiheit, Recht und Brot!

 Von uns wird einst die Nachwelt zeugen,
 schon blickt auf uns die Gegenwart.
 Frisch auf, beginnen wir den Reigen,
 ist auch der Boden rau und hart.
 Schließt die Phalanx in dichten Reihen!
 Je höher uns umrauscht die Flut,
 je mehr mit der Begeisterung Glut
 dem heiligen Kampfe uns zu weihen,

 Refrain

 Auf denn, Gesinnungskameraden,
 bekräftigt heut aufs neu den Bund,
 dass nicht die grünen Saaten
 gehn vor dem Erntefest zugrund,
 Ist auch der Säemann gefallen,
 in guten Boden fiel die Saat,
 uns aber bleibt die kühne Tat,
 heil aber bleibt die Tat,
 heilges Vermächtnis sei sie allen.

 Refrain

English translation (rhymeless) 
 Come, who respects law and truth,
 to our flag that is so high!
 Even if the lie still deludes us,
 soon the morning will rise brightly!
 It's a difficult fight, to which we dare.
 Our enemies are too many to number
 Indeed even if the danger, like flames
 may dash us to pieces,

 Refrain:

 we do not fear the enemy,
 we stand united in the fight!
 March, march, march, march
 and be it through torment and distress,
 for freedom, justice and bread!

 One day will come, posterity will bear witness to us
 the present is already looking at us.
 Fresh up, let's start the dance,
 It is the soil also rough and hard.
 Close the phalanx in dense rows!
 The higher we are surrounded by the tide,
 the more with the enthusiasm we glow
 to dedicate ourselves to the holy struggle

Refrain

 On, fellows,
 reaffirm the covenant today,
 that do not the green crops
 be destroyed before the harvest festival,
 Has the sower fallen,
 in good soil fell the seed,
 but the bold deed remains with us[,]
 but the deed remains,
 sacred legacy be it all.

Refrain

Alternate refrain 
For the funeral of Ferdinand Lassalle, the refrain was rewritten:

 Nicht zählen wir den Feind,
 nicht die Gefahren all!
 Marsch, marsch, marsch, marsch
 Der kühnen Bahn nun folgen wir,
 die uns geführt Lasalle!

Which translates to English as:
 We do not fear the enemy,
 nor the dangers all!
 March, march, march, march
 We now follow the bold path,
 the one into which Lasalle guided us!

References

External links 
 Walzenaufnahme nach Edison von ca. 1909 (MP3; 2,2 MB)
 Andreas, Franz, Günter & Thomas (MP3; 2,2 MB)

German songs
German-language songs
1864 songs
La Marseillaise